Poirot is a French surname. Notable people with the surname include:

Catherine Poirot (born 1963), French swimmer
Gilbert Poirot (1944–2012), French ski jumper
Jefferson Poirot (born 1992), French rugby union player
Lionel Poirot (born 1973), French swimmer

Fictional characters
Hercule Poirot, a detective created by Agatha Christie

See also
Bertrand Poirot-Delpech (1929–2006), French writer
Romain Poirot-Lellig (born 1978), French investment consultant and writer

French-language surnames